Wassim Joseph Slaiby (born November 16, 1979), better known as Sal (usually stylized in all caps), is a Lebanese-Canadian music industry executive, talent manager, entrepreneur, and philanthropist. He is the co-founder and current CEO of XO Records, and the co-manager of the label's primary artist, singer the Weeknd. He also manages other artists on the label, including singer Black Atlass and rappers Belly and Nav. In addition, Slaiby is the founder and CEO of Universal Arabic Music, in partnership with Universal Music Group and Republic Records.

Slaiby is also the founder of his management company SALXCO, through which he also manages artists such as Doja Cat, Bebe Rexha, Nicki Minaj, Sean "Diddy" Combs, French Montana, M.I.A., Swedish House Mafia, Ty Dolla Sign, Brandy, Sabrina Claudio, Christine and the Queens and Nasri. He also manages producers and songwriters, including Jason "DaHeala" Quenneville, DannyBoyStyles, Metro Boomin, Breyan Isaac, London On Da Track, Rob Knox, Harry Fraud, and Fabian Marasciullo. Slaiby was the co-founder of CP Music Group, as well as a partner in the Maverick consortium.

Early life
Wassim Joseph Slaiby was born in Ghazir, Lebanon on November 16, 1979. His father passed away when he was ten years old. He escaped the Lebanese Civil War conflict and immigrated to Canada without family when he was fifteen years old. He initially lived in Montreal before moving to Ottawa in his late teens.

Career

2002–2011: CP Music Group 
Slaiby began his music industry career after meeting and seeing a young fellow immigrant rapper Belly freestyle rapping on an Ottawa street in 2002. Slaiby started managing Belly, with whom he co-founded Capital Prophets Records, which would go on to be known as the CP Music Group. Slaiby also hired Amir "Cash" Esmailian, who was a close friend of Belly, as the head of street promotion for the label. 

Rapper Belly and singer Massari were the first artists signed to the new record label by Slaiby. Massari's 2005 self-titled album was certified Gold in Canada and garnered a Juno Award nomination. Belly's 2007 album, The Revolution, won the Juno Award for Rap Recording of the Year. Within six years, CP Music Group had become the dominant independent hip-hop and R&B label in Canada.

2011–present: XO Records, SALXCO and Universal Arabic Music 
In 2011, Slaiby met and began co-managing the singer the Weeknd with Esmailian, and co-founded XO Records with the artist and his creative director La Mar Taylor. Through the label, the Weeknd released his first three mixtapes; House of Balloons, Thursday, and Echoes of Silence, which were produced in-house by Illangelo. In 2012, XO Records was assumed by Universal Music Group as a subsidiary label following the Weeknd signing with Republic Records. In 2013, Slaiby added DaHeala, DannyBoyStyles, Harry Fraud and Belly as in-house producers and songwriters. Slaiby became the label's CEO in 2015.

In 2011, Slaiby founded his own artist and talent management company SALXCO, and later sold the CP Music Group to Live Nation. In May 2016, he partnered with Guy Oseary's Maverick consortium. Through SALXCO, Slaiby manages the artists signed to XO Records, including singer Black Atlass and rapper Nav, and other artists and producers such as Doja Cat, Diddy, Nicki Minaj, London On Da Track, Ali Gatie, Harry Fraud, Metro Boomin, Bebe Rexha and Swedish House Mafia.

On April 6, 2021, Universal Music Group and Republic Records announced the launch of the new record label Universal Arabic Music, with Slaiby serving as its founder and CEO.

Other ventures 
In December 2017, Slaiby joined the Lebanon-based music streaming service, Anghami, as the head of international partnerships. In 2018, he joined the board of HXOUSE, an incubator founded by La Mar Taylor, Belly and the Weeknd consisting of a 30,000-square-foot space facility located near Toronto's waterfront that provides studio rooms and offers equipment needed for recording, designing, and producing at a low cost for young artists. In the same year, he helped bring Shakira to the Cedars International Festival in Lebanon. 

In 2019, Slaiby became an investor of the music-focused social video platform Triller. In April 2019, he was invited as a guest speaker to the Brilliant Minds, an annual conference created by Spotify founder Daniel Ek, where he was among a panel of speakers that included former US President Barack Obama, businessman Even Spiegel, and scientist Hartmut Neven.

Philanthropy 
In 2017, Slaiby and French Montana helped build the Suubi Hospital in Uganda in conjunction with Global Citizen and Mama Hope. In February 2018, he joined the advisory board of the international organization Global Citizen. In November 2018, he canceled his annual birthday party as a result of the deadly wildfires in California and urged his followers in an Instagram post to donate to the Los Angeles Fire Department and the California Community Foundation's Wildfire Relief Fund.

In response to the 2020 Beirut explosion, Slaiby, alongside his wife Rima Fakih, started a campaign called #GlobalAidForLebanon, in collaboration with Global Citizen and the United Nations World Food Programme. The fundraiser has raised over 2 million dollars to provide assistance to those affected.

Personal life
On May 15, 2016, Slaiby married Lebanese model, philanthropist and Miss USA 2010 Rima Fakih in a ceremony at The Patriarchal Edifice in Bkerké, Lebanon. The wedding was attended by numerous celebrities, including The Weeknd, French Montana, Haifa Wehbe, and Wael Kfoury and was presided over by Maronite Patriarch, Bechara Boutros al-Rahi. The couple have three children together; Rima, Joseph, and Amira. They reside in Los Angeles, California.

Slaiby is a Maronite Christian and, in 2017, was invited to visit the Pope who blessed his newborn daughter.

Honors and recognition 
 2015 – 40 under 40's Top Young Power Players
 2017 – Billboard Power 100 (no.52)
 2018 – Billboard Power 100 (no.53)
2020 – Variety's Manager of the Year 
2021 – Billboard International Power Player

References

External links
SAL&CO official website

1979 births
Living people
Lebanese emigrants to Canada
Canadian Maronites
XO (record label)
Canadian music industry executives
Canadian music managers
Canadian businesspeople
Canadian philanthropists
The Weeknd